Latin Lovers is a 1965 Italian comedy film directed by Mario Costa.

Plot
The film is composed of five episodes in which is shown the love of the Italians in the 60s. Among the low quality of love stories, the episode stands out with Totò: Amore e morte (Love and death).

Segment: Love and death
Antonio Gargiulo is a poor accountant who goes to the hospital to collect medical records, suspecting that he has a serious bad health. But he's fine: really bad is the grandfather of a girl who does not give peace for the bad news. Antonio is sorry and tries to console she and offers her to exchange the medical records: so the old man, discovering to feel good, will die happy. She accepts, and at the same time falls in love with Antonio who, wanting to have fun with she, sends the clinic record in accounting, to lend him the money from the board immediately.

Cast
Toni Ucci as Augusto (segment "La grande conquista")
Vittorio Congia as Maurizio (segment "La grande conquista")
Alicia Brandet as Ursula (segment "La grande conquista")
Eva Gioia as Elisabeth (segment "La grande conquista")
Gisella Sofio as Miss Beata (segment "Il telefono consolatore")
Aldo Giuffrè as Arminio (segment "Il telefono consolatore")
Lina Maryan as Carmelina (segment "Il telefono consolatore") (as Gara Granda)
Antonietta Tefri - (segment "Il telefono consolatore")
Nino Marchetti as Riccardo (segment "Il telefono consolatore")
Luigi Tosi - (segment "Il telefono consolatore")
Daniela Surina - (segment "Il telefono consolatore")
Aldo Puglisi as Saro (segment "L'irreparabile")
Jolanda Modio as Lucia Trapani (segment "L'irreparabile")
Enzo Garinei as Fifì (segment "L'irreparabile")
Carlo Sposito as L'amico di Fifì (segment "L'irreparabile") (as Carletto Sposito)
Armando Curcio - (segment "L'irreparabile")
Nino Musco - (segment "L'irreparabile")
Pietro Tordi - (segment "L'irreparabile")
Francesco Mulé as Lawyer (segment "L'irreparabile")
Elena Nicolai as Mrs Trapani (segment "L'irreparabile")
Totò as Antonio Gargiulo (segment "Amore e morte")
Franco Franchi as Franco (segment "Gli amanti latini")
Ciccio Ingrassia as Ciccio (segment "Gli amanti latini")

References

External links 
 

1965 films
1960s Italian-language films
1965 comedy films
Films set in Rome
Films set in Sicily
Italian comedy films
Films with screenplays by Giovanni Grimaldi
Films scored by Carlo Savina
Films directed by Mario Costa
1960s Italian films